Miss India Worldwide 2002 was the 12th edition of the international beauty pageant. The final was held in Durban, South Africa on  November 2, 2002. About 25 countries were represented in the pageant. Santripti Vellody  of Dubai was crowned as the winner at the end of the event.

Results

Special awards

Delegates
 – Lalenya Brown
 – Naushina Khan
 – Kiran Shergrill
 – Santripi Vellody
 – Nidhya Paalakaria
 – Marita Ann Persaud
 – Rohini Banjeree
 – Sonia Sheikh
 – Jasminder Kaur Chalal
 – Khiloni Baboo
 – Vandanah Mahadeo
 – Dharma Govind
 – Radha Sudan
 – Kuljit Singh
 – Xiyan Aweke
 – Karoona Nunhuck
 – Gayathri Unnijkrishan
 – Sorisha Naidoo
 – Amrita Chandra
 – Nadya Nandanie Ramnath
 – Fenulla Jiwani
 – Suky Kaur Sangha
 – Priya Arora
 – Minal Shukla

References

External links
http://www.worldwidepageants.com/

2002 beauty pageants